The Kunming dialect is a dialect  of Southwestern Mandarin Chinese. Luo Changpei describes it as having "simple phonemes, elegant vocabulary, and clear grammar."

Beginnings
The beginnings of the Kunming dialect are closely linked with the migration of the Han Chinese to Yunnan. The differences between "old" Kunming dialect and the "new" dialect began in the 1940s. In the aftermath of the Second Sino-Japanese War, large numbers of refugees from the north of China and the Jiangnan region fled to Kunming, with profound effects for the politics, economy and culture of the city. This large influx of outsiders also had an influence on the local dialect, which slowly developed into the "new" Kunming dialect.

Learning
The tones, pronunciation, and lexicon are distinct between Northern Mandarin and Kunming dialect.

References

Kunming
Mandarin Chinese
Dialects by location